"Vitamin D" is a song by American rapper Ludacris, featuring vocals from American singer Ty Dolla Sign. It was released March 31, 2017 as the lead single from Ludacris's upcoming ninth studio album, set for release in 2018. The track was produced by Da Internz , Miykal Snoddy and GMF.

The song contains a sample of "Thong Song" by Sisqó.

Music video
On April 10, 2017, Ludacris uploaded the music video for "Vitamin D" on his YouTube account.

Release history

References

2017 songs
2017 singles
Ludacris songs
Songs written by Ludacris
Song recordings produced by Da Internz
Songs written by Ty Dolla Sign
Songs written by Tim Kelley
Songs written by Bob Robinson (songwriter)
Songs written by Sisqó